Adamantanone is the ketone of adamantane.  A white solid, it is prepared by oxidation of adamantane. It is a precursor to several adamantane derivatives.

Adamantanone and some related polycyclic ketones, are reluctant to form enolates.  This barrier arises because the resulting carbanion cannot exist in conjugation with the carbonyl pi-bond.

References

Adamantanes
Ketones